Scott Run is a  long 2nd order tributary to Cross Creek in Brooke County, West Virginia.

Course
Scott Run rises about 1.5 miles southeast of Eldersville, Pennsylvania , in Washington County and then flows southwest into West Virginia to join Cross Creek at Scott Run, West Virginia.

Watershed
Scott Run drains  of area, receives about 40.3 in/year of precipitation, has a wetness index of 322.78, and is about 53% forested.

See also
List of Rivers of West Virginia
List of Rivers of Pennsylvania

References

Rivers of Pennsylvania
Rivers of West Virginia
Rivers of Washington County, Pennsylvania
Rivers of Brooke County, West Virginia